The Birmingham Pullman was a named passenger train operating in the United Kingdom.

History
The Birmingham Pullman was operated by the Blue Pullman and introduced by British Rail on 12 September 1960. Departures from Wolverhampton Low Level station at 7:00am, with pickups at Birmingham Snow Hill at 7:30am, Solihull at 7:40am and Leamington Spa at 8:00 gave an arrival time at London Paddington of 9:35am. A second departure left Birmingham Snow Hill at 2:30pm, with an arrival at London Paddington of 4:25pm.

The return services departed London Paddington at 12:10pm, arriving in Birmingham Snow Hill at 2:05pm. The evening train left Paddington at 4:50pm and arrived back at Birmingham Snow Hill at 6:55pm, and Wolverhampton Low Level at 7:20pm.

On 15 August 1963, a replacement service for the Birmingham Pullman train, hauled by British Rail Class 52 D1040 Western Queen, ran into freight wagons near Solihull, killing all three men in the cab. It was found to be a signaller's error.

With the electrification of the West Coast Main Line in 1966, the service was withdrawn and the trains were transferred to the Western Region.

References

Named passenger trains of British Rail
Railway services introduced in 1960
1960 establishments in England